The 1983–84 season was the 87th season of competitive football in Scotland.

Scottish Premier Division

Champions: Aberdeen
Relegated: St. Johnstone, Motherwell

Scottish League Division One

Promoted: Morton, Dumbarton
Relegated: Raith Rovers, Alloa Athletic

Scottish League Division Two

Promoted: Forfar Athletic, East Fife

Other honours

Cup honours

Individual honours

Scottish national team

Key:
(H) = Home match
(A) = Away match
ECQG1 = European Championship qualifying - Group 1
BHC = British Home Championship

See also
1983–84 Aberdeen F.C. season

Notes and references

 
Seasons in Scottish football